The 2015–16 National Ringette League season for the sport of ringette was the 12th season of the National Ringette League and began on October 3, 2015 and ended on April 9, 2016. 

The Cambridge Turbos won the national championship, winning their fifth national title.

Teams 
Another team joined the league this season.
 Black Gold Rush: West Division

Quebec City Cyclones and Prairie Fire did not join the league for three straight seasons.

Regular Seasons 
East Division teams would play 28 games which consisted 1, 2 or 4 games against same division team and some of those team will played against West Division teams none, 2 or 4 games.

West Division teams would play 26 games which consisted 6 games against same division team and play none, 2 or 4 game against East Division teams.

Season Opener 
This was the first game of the season and was sponsored by Fuelling Women Championship.

Standings 
x indicates clinches the playoff
y indicates clinches the Championship (Elite Eight)

East Conference

West Conference

Playoffs 

 Atlantic, Gloucester, Ottawa and Black Gold wins the knockout stage and advance to Elite Eight.
 Gloucester is in first place of Elite eight and clinches final directly. While, Cambridge and Ottawa is second and third place respectively, they clinch semifinal.
 Cambridge beat the Ottawa and advance to the final.
 Cambridge beat the Gloucester to win the final. This is the first loss for Gloucester in the playoffs.

Award 
MVP: Jaqueline Gaudet (CAM)

Stats 
Regular season
 Player expect goalie
 Goal
 East Jacqueline Gaudet, Martine Caissie (both are 61, CAM and ATL respectively)
 West Shaundra Bruvall (48, CGY)
 Assist
 East Julie Blanchette (83, MTL)
 West Shaundra Bruvall (35, CGY)
 Point
 East Julie Blanchette (128, MTL)
 West Shaundra Bruvall (83, CGY)
Goalie
Saving %
East Jessie Callander (.910, CAM) 
West Bobbi Mattson (.901, CGY)
Goals against average
East Jessie Callander (3.27, CAM) 
West Breanna Beck (3.46, EDM)
Win
East Jessie Callander (15, CAM) 
West Breanna Beck (10, EDM)
Playoff

References 

National Ringette League
Ringette
Ringette competitions